Bukit Gombak Single Member Constituency (SMC) was a single member constituency in the western area in Singapore. The seat consisted of Bukit Gombak New Town with is made up of Bukit Gombak MRT station and a few private housing estates such as the Hillview area. It was formed in 1988 by carving out Bukit Batok SMC. 

In the first election Seet Ai Mee won against Ling How Doong on her first stint in politics, and was defeated 3 years later by Ling in 1991. Ling was then defeated by Ang Mong Seng.

In 2001, Bukit Gombak SMC was absorbed into Hong Kah Group Representation Constituency.

Member of Parliament

Elections

Elections in 1980s

Elections in 1990s

References 

Singaporean electoral divisions